Marcus Cleverly (born 15 June 1981, in Hillerød) is a Danish handballer who currently plays goalkeeper for the KIF Kolding København and the Danish national team.

References

External links
 Profile at Vive Targi Kielce official website

1981 births
Living people
Danish male handball players
Handball players at the 2012 Summer Olympics
Olympic handball players of Denmark
Lugi HF players
Sportspeople from the Capital Region of Denmark